The list of shipwrecks in 1981 includes ships sunk, foundered, grounded, or otherwise lost during 1981.

January

1 January

6 January

7 January

17 January

26 January

27 January

30 January

Unknown date

February

6 February

8 February

13 February

19 February

24 February

26 February

28 February

Unknown date

March

4 March

8 March

13 March

25 March

April

9 April

May

14 May

19 May

20 May

22 May

June

1 June

15 June

Unknown date

July

3 July

12 July

20 July

27 July

August

3 August

4 August

7 August

10 August

20 August

21 August

26 August

September

7 September

9 September

13 September

14 September

18 September

19 September

20 September

21 September

24 September

27 September

30 September

Unknown date

October

21 October

22 October

27 October

28 October

30 October

31 October

November

12 November

15 November

26 November

27 November

30 November

December

8 December

13 December

14 December

19 December

20 December

23 December

28 December

29 December

30 December

Unknown date

References

See also 

1981
 
Shipwrecks